Jonas Eduardo Américo, called Edu, (born 6 August 1949) is a Brazilian former footballer.

Edu was born in Jaú, São Paulo. From 1966 to 1985 he played for Santos, Corinthians, Internacional, Tigres UANL (in Mexico), São Cristovão and Nacional Fast Clube.  He won five Campeonato Paulista titles (1967, 1968, 1969, 1973, 1977) and received the Brazilian Silver Ball Award in 1971.

With the Brazilian team he played in 42 matches, from June 1966 to June 1976, and scored eight goals. He was a 1970 World Champion, and was also selected for Brazil at the 1966 and the 1974 FIFA World Cup. He played once in 1970 and once in 1974. He was also called up for the 1966 FIFA World Cup, at 16 years and 339 days of age at the start of the tournament, being the youngest player to ever be called up for the tournament; however, he did not play in any match.

More recently Edu played in an all-stars masters team in touring exhibition matches.

References

1949 births
Living people
Brazilian footballers
Brazilian expatriate footballers
Santos FC players
Sport Club Internacional players
Tigres UANL footballers
Campeonato Brasileiro Série A players
Liga MX players
1966 FIFA World Cup players
1970 FIFA World Cup players
1974 FIFA World Cup players
FIFA World Cup-winning players
Brazil international footballers
Expatriate footballers in Mexico
Association football forwards
People from Jaú